Buffalo Exchange is an American fashion resale retailer. Operating under a "buy, sell, trade" business model, it buys clothing and accessories from the public and resells them to the public. Buffalo Exchange targets a wide range of styles and ages with a mix of new and recycled clothing and accessories, including current trends, everyday staples, vintage, one-of-a-kind items, designer and more. Though often considered a thrift store, rather than receiving donations, they hand-select and purchase the majority of their inventory from the local community. This makes for a more curated selection.

Buffalo Exchange was founded in 1974 in Tucson, Arizona by Kerstin Block and her husband, Spencer Block. It is still owned and operated by Kerstin and her daughter Rebecca. The company has remained headquartered in Tucson and operates around 40 stores across the United States.

Company History 
In 1974, Kerstin Block had an idea for a different sort of secondhand shop that would be clean, bright and curated and make secondhand clothing and accessories more accessible. Kerstin and her husband, Spencer, rented out a small 400 square foot spot in Tucson, AZ and pioneered the concept of buy-sell-trade for clothing, which was different from existing thrift and consignment models. They handpicked each item based on what their customers were interested in buying, paid out on the spot and displayed everything in a fun, easy-to-shop space. 

Originally from Sweden, Kerstin came to Tucson for a scholarship at the University of Arizona, where she met her husband Spencer. She chose the name “Buffalo” because it sounded very American to her.

Within the first couple of years, they started expanding in Arizona and eventually opened a location in San Francisco. In the 1990s, the popularity of secondhand shopping grew and the husband-wife duo opened up 19 new locations across California, the Southwest and the Northwest.

The company is known for giving back to the community through initiatives like its annual Earth Day $1 Sale and its Tokens for Bags program.

Buy-Sell-Trade Process 
Buffalo Exchange buys from open to close every day, with no appointment required to sell. Sellers are required to bring a valid, government-issued ID like a Driver’s License or Passport or, if under 18, must bring an adult with a valid ID. For items they are able to buy, they pay out 50% of their selling price in store trade or 25% in cash on-the-spot. Sellers can take any mix of trade and cash. The company notes that they buy the best of all seasons, year-round, and make selections based on current inventory needs.

References

External links
 Buffalo Exchange Official site.

Clothing retailers of the United States
Retail companies established in 1974
Companies based in Tucson, Arizona